Martin Damm and Robert Lindstedt were the defending champions, but they chose to not compete together.
Damm partnered up with Oliver Marach, but they were eliminated by Rohan Bopanna and Aisam-ul-Haq Qureshi in the first round.
Lindstedt chose to play with Horia Tecău, but they were eliminated by Marcos Baghdatis and Stanislas Wawrinka in the first round.
Mardy Fish and Mark Knowles won the title, defeating Tomáš Berdych and Radek Štěpánek 4–6, 7–6(9–7), [10–7] in the finals.

Seeds

Draw

Draw

External links
 Doubles draw

Doubles